Daisuke Kato (born 22 December 1965) is a Japanese equestrian. He competed in two events at the 2000 Summer Olympics.

References

External links
 
 
 

1965 births
Living people
Japanese male equestrians
Olympic equestrians of Japan
Equestrians at the 2000 Summer Olympics
Place of birth missing (living people)
Asian Games medalists in equestrian
Equestrians at the 2002 Asian Games
Equestrians at the 2006 Asian Games
Asian Games gold medalists for Japan
Asian Games silver medalists for Japan
Asian Games bronze medalists for Japan
Medalists at the 2002 Asian Games
Medalists at the 2006 Asian Games